This is a list of the National Register of Historic Places listings in Fayette County, Pennsylvania.

This is intended to be a complete list of the properties and districts on the National Register of Historic Places in Fayette County, Pennsylvania, United States.  The locations of National Register properties and districts for which the latitude and longitude coordinates are included below, may be seen in a map.

There are 68 properties and districts listed on the National Register in the county.  Four sites are further designated as National Historic Landmarks. One is also designated as a National Historic Site and another is designated as a National Battlefield.

Current listings

|}

See also

 National Register of Historic Places listings in Pennsylvania
 List of National Historic Landmarks in Pennsylvania
 List of Pennsylvania state historical markers in Fayette County

References

.
Buildings and structures in Fayette County, Pennsylvania
Fayette County